Romain Froment (born 26 May, 1977) is a French rugby union player.
He began his career at Stade Français in the Top 14, making his debut for France on 3 July 2004 against USA.

References

External links
espnscrum profile

French rugby union players
Rugby union flankers
France international rugby union players
1977 births
Living people